Give Her a Ring is a 1934 British musical film directed by Arthur B. Woods and starring Clifford Mollison, Wendy Barrie, and Zelma O'Neal. The film was a remake of the 1932 German film Wrong Number, Miss, and is sometimes known by the title Giving You the Stars. Stewart Granger made an appearance in the film, early in his career.

Plot
In Copenhagen, a worker in a telephone exchange falls in love with her employer.

Cast
 Wendy Barrie as Karen Svenson 
 Clifford Mollison as Paul Hendrick 
 Zelma O'Neal as Trude Olsen 
 Bertha Belmore as Miss Hoffman 
 Erik Rhodes as Otto Brune 
 Olive Blakeney as Mrs. Brune 
 Syd Crossley as Gustav 
 Jimmy Godden as Uncle Rifkin 
 Richard Hearne as Drunk 
 Nadine March as Karen's friend 
 Pat Fitzpatrick as Boy 
 Stewart Granger as Diner

References

External links

1934 films
1934 musical films
Films shot at British International Pictures Studios
1930s English-language films
Films directed by Arthur B. Woods
British remakes of German films
British black-and-white films
British musical films
Films set in Copenhagen
1930s British films